Mages of Mystralia is an action-adventure video game developed and published by Canadian studio Borealys Games. It was released for Microsoft Windows, PlayStation 4, and Xbox One in 2017, and for the Nintendo Switch in 2019.

Plot
The game is set in the land of Mystralia and follows Zia, a mage who discovers her magical powers at the beginning of the game. After being exiled from her village due to unintentionally causing turmoil through her powers, she meets a character self-described as the Mentor, who convinces her to travel to a mage sanctuary to improve her skills as a mage. Zia is eventually tasked with preventing a war between an army of trolls and the anti-mage Kingdom of Mystralia, whilst learning more of her destiny and uncovering a more sinister plot.

Reception

Reviews for the game have been "mixed or average", with the game currently holding an average score of 74 on Metacritic. Destructoid gave the game a 7 out of 10 calling the game "solid" and stating that it's a "decent adventure with varied combat, cool boss battles, and semi-interesting locales". Game Informer gave the game an 8 out of 10 praising its gameplay, describing it as "engrossing", and calling the in-game magic system as "brilliant".

References

External links 

2017 video games
Action-adventure games
Kickstarter-funded video games
PlayStation 4 games
Video games adapted into comics
Video games developed in Canada
Video games featuring female protagonists
Windows games
Xbox One games
Nintendo Switch games
Single-player video games